The 2020 Singapore Premier League season is Tanjong Pagar United's 15th season at the top level of Singapore football. The club will also compete in the Singapore Cup.

It was first reported that the Jaguar was applying to play for the 2020 season after the announcement of Warrior's plight.

On 19 January 2020, FAS confirmed that the club "met all the necessary pre-requisites for participation in the SPL 2020 season."

They will be playing in the Jurong East Stadium, sharing with Albirex Niigata (S) for the 2020 season.

Squad

Sleague Squad

U19 Squad

Coaching staff

Transfers

Pre-season transfers

In

Out

Mid Season

In

Out

Friendlies

Pre-Season Friendly

Team statistics

Appearances and goals 

Numbers in parentheses denote appearances as substitute.

Competitions

Overview

Singapore Premier League

Singapore Cup

Notes

References 

Tanjong Pagar United FC
Tanjong Pagar United FC